{{Infobox settlement
| name                     = 
| image_skyline            = Pasacao Aerial.JPG
| image_caption            = Aerial shot of Pasacao with its port and oil depot.
| image_seal               = Pasacao_Official_Sel.png
| seal_size                = 100x80px
| image_map                = 
| map_caption              = 
| image_map1               = 
| pushpin_map              = Philippines
| pushpin_label_position   = left
| pushpin_map_caption      = Location within the 
| coordinates              = 
| settlement_type          = 
| subdivision_type         = Country
| subdivision_name         = Philippines
| subdivision_type1        = Region
| subdivision_name1        = 
| subdivision_type2        = Province
| subdivision_name2        = 
| official_name            = 
| native_name              = 
| other_name               = 
| nickname                 = Summer Capital of Camarines Sur
| motto                    = Matatag{{efn|{{ubl|Malinig (English: Clean)|Asensado (English: Prosperous)|Trangkilo (English: Peaceful)|Areglado (English: Organized)|Tarabangan para sa aktibong pag gobernar (English: Cooperated for an active governance)}}}} na Bayan ng Pasacao
| anthem                   = 
| subdivision_type3        = District
| subdivision_name3        = 2nd district
| established_title        = Founded
| established_date         = 1872
| parts_type               = Barangays
| parts_style              = para
| p1                       = 19 (see Barangays)
| leader_title             =  
| leader_name              = Jorge R. Bengua
| leader_title1            = Vice Mayor
| leader_name1             = Maryol O. Tayco
| leader_title2            = Representative 
| leader_name2             = Luis Raymund F. Villafuerte Jr.
| leader_title3            = Municipal Council
| leader_name3             = 
| leader_title4            = Electorate
| leader_name4             =  voters
| government_type          = 
| government_footnotes     = 
| elevation_m              = 
| elevation_max_m          = 756
| elevation_min_m          = 0
| elevation_max_rank       = 
| elevation_min_rank       = 
| elevation_footnotes      = 
| elevation_max_footnotes  = 
| elevation_min_footnotes  = 
| area_footnotes           = 
| area_total_km2           = 
| population_footnotes     = 
| population_total         = 
| population_as_of         = 
| population_density_km2   = auto
| population_blank1_title  = Households
| population_blank1        = 
| population_blank2_title  = 
| population_blank2        = 
| population_demonym       = Pasaqueño (Masculine)
Pasaqueña (Feminine)
| population_rank          = 
| population_note          = 
| timezone                 = PST
| utc_offset               = +8
| postal_code_type         = ZIP code
| postal_code              = 
| postal2_code_type        = 
| postal2_code             = 
| area_code_type           = 
| area_code                = 
| website                  = 
| demographics_type1       = Economy
| demographics1_title1     = 
| demographics1_info1      = 1st municipal income class
| demographics1_title2     = Poverty incidence
| demographics1_info2      = 41.62% (2015)
| demographics1_title3     = Revenue
| demographics1_info3      = ₱197,378,822.82 
| demographics1_title4     = Revenue rank
| demographics1_info4      = 
| demographics1_title5     = Assets
| demographics1_info5      =  
| demographics1_title6     = Assets rank
| demographics1_info6      = 
| demographics1_title7     = IRA
| demographics1_info7      = 
| demographics1_title8     = IRA rank
| demographics1_info8      = 
| demographics1_title9     = Expenditure
| demographics1_info9      =  
| demographics1_title10    = Liabilities
| demographics1_info10     =  
| demographics_type2       = Service provider
| demographics2_title1     = Electricity
| demographics2_info1      = 
| demographics2_title2     = Water
| demographics2_info2      = Pasacao Water District (PAWADI)
| demographics2_title3     = Telecommunications
| demographics2_title4     = Cable TV
| demographics2_title5     = 
| demographics2_info5      = 
| demographics2_title6     = 
| demographics2_info6      = 
| demographics2_title7     = 
| demographics2_info7      = 
| demographics2_title8     = 
| demographics2_info8      = 
| demographics2_title9     = 
| demographics2_info9      = 
| demographics2_title10    = 
| demographics2_info10     = 
| blank_name_sec1          = 
| blank_info_sec1          = 
| blank1_name_sec1         = Native languages
| blank1_info_sec1         = 
| blank2_name_sec1         = Crime index
| blank2_info_sec1         = 
| blank3_name_sec1         = 
| blank3_info_sec1         = 
| blank4_name_sec1         = 
| blank4_info_sec1         = 
| blank5_name_sec1         = 
| blank5_info_sec1         = 
| blank6_name_sec1         = 
| blank6_info_sec1         = 
| blank7_name_sec1         = 
| blank7_info_sec1         = 
| blank1_name_sec2         = Major religions
| blank1_info_sec2         = Roman Catholicism
| blank2_name_sec2         = Feast date
| blank2_info_sec2         = August 30
| blank3_name_sec2         = Catholic diocese
| blank3_info_sec2         = Diocese of Libmanan
| blank4_name_sec2         = Patron saint
| blank4_info_sec2         = Saint Rose of Lima
| blank5_name_sec2         = 
| blank5_info_sec2         = 
| blank6_name_sec2         = 
| blank6_info_sec2         = 
| blank7_name_sec2         = 
| blank7_info_sec2         = 
| short_description        = 
| footnotes                = 
| elevation_min_ft         = 0
| elevation_max_ft         = 
| elevation_ft             = 
| elevation_min_point      = Ragay Gulf
| elevation_max_point      = Mount Bernacci
}}

Pasacao, officially the Municipality of Pasacao, is a 2nd class municipality in the province of Camarines Sur, Philippines. According to the 2020 census, it has a population of 53,461 people.

It is famed for its stretch of brownish sand beaches, earning it the title "Summer Capital of Camarines Sur". The municipality's landmarks include the town's symbol, Daruanak Island, and the Port of Pasacao.

During the Spanish colonization in the 16th century, Pasacao was one of the embarkation points in Camarines Sur and was the only sea transportation link to Manila. It played a vital role in the development of commerce and trade in the province.

The town was formed in 1872, according to records from the Archdiocese of Cáceres.

Etymology
The town's name is derived from the Spanish-Tagalog portmanteau Pasa-Ikaw (English: Pass it on). This is because dock guards stationed at the Pasacao Port would regularly issue directions to passengers by shouting "Pasa ikaw, Pasa ikaw." Passengers mistook the phrase for the town's name, Pasacao.

History

 Moro piracy 
From 1585 to the 19th century, Pasacao served as a crucial defense port against Moro pirate incursions. The continuing Moro piracy, such as the one in Caranan on October 4, 1779, is an example. Pasacao and other 9 towns and two missions were entirely destroyed; ten churches were robbed and torched; 8,000 indigenous people were captured or slain; one priest was killed, two were captured; and Caceres, the capital, was placed on high alert one night. In 1823, the town had an estimated population of only 200 people due to frequent attacks.

As defense of Pasacao against these raids, Alcalde Jacinto Rodriguez Morales contributed material for a balwark. He also gave watchmen rations. The fortification of Pasacao in 1848, which included Cabusao in Camarines Sur, Pantao (now Libon), and Donsol in Sorsogon, was motivated by these persistent moro invasions.

 Post-colonization 
Between 1609 and 1616, during the governor generalship of Juan de Silva, two galleons, the Nuestra Seora de Guadalupe and Angel dela Guardia, were built in Barangay Dalupaon, as well as the Astillero de Dalupaon (English: Dalupaon Shipyard). Guadalupe was vital in the galleon commerce between Manila and Acapulco, as well as the defense of the Philippines against the Dutch at the Battle of Playa Honda.

When World War II broke out on December 8, 1941, Juan Q. Miranda and Elias Madrid, both from Canaman and Leon Sa. It was the province's first big guerilla unit, established on March 18, 1942. The TVGU takes its name from Mount Bernacci, where they set up camp. Miranda commanded 67 men from multiple guerilla squads in a two-and-a-half-hour convoy ambush near Taguild, Pamplona, on November 8, 1942. Colonel Susumo Takechi (the Japanese commander in Naga), two captains, two lieutenants, and 168 to 200 enlisted men were all slain. Other significant historical events in Pasacao also left their mark. When the Japanese ships docked at the Pasacao Pier, it was bombed. Until today, some Japanese ships have been visible in clear waters.

In 1945, American Taylorcraft L-2 Grasshopper planes landed in Tinalmud, bringing The Six Daughters of Charity to the Pasacao seashore to establish Naga City's first regular girls' school, Universidad de Santa Isabel.

Geography
Pasacao is situated on the northwest coast of the Camarines Sur. The town is bordered by Mount Bernacci that it shares a border with Libmanan in the northwest, San Fernando in the east, and Pamplona in the north..

The total land area of Pasacao is approximately 149.54 square-kilometer, with much of the terrain consisting of rolling hills and mountains. The town's topography is characterized by steep slopes, with elevations ranging from sea level to over 400 meters above sea level. The highest point in the town is Mount Bernacci, which stands at 756 meters above sea level.

Pasacao is also home to several rivers and creeks, including the Itulan River and Tinalmud River, which flows into the Ragay Gulf. Other rivers and creeks in the town include the Caranan River and Dalupaon River.

Pasacao is also known for its rich natural resources, particularly its abundant fishery and marine life. The town has a sanctuary and a marine protected area, the Stampa Beach, which are home to a wide variety of marine species including fish, corals, and sea turtles.

The town has a long coastline stretching for about 22 kilometers, making it a popular destination for beach lovers. Pasacao's beaches are known for their fine brown sand and crystal-clear waters, and they offer a variety of water activities such as swimming, snorkeling, and fishing. The most popular beach in Pasacao is Balogo Beach, where the Daruanak Island is situated, which is a favorite spot for locals and tourists alike.

In summary, Pasacao is a municipality characterized by a rugged terrain, a long coastline, and a tropical climate. Its natural features make it an attractive destination for tourists seeking outdoor adventures and relaxation by the beach.

Barangays

Pasacao is politically subdivided into 19 barangays.

 Poblacion

Climate

According to the Köppen climate classification system, Pasacao has a tropical rainforest climate. The north-east monsoon dominates the area; therefore, rainfall is evenly spread throughout the year. From October to January, the wind blows from north to east, from east to southeast from February to April, and from May to September, it blows from east to southeast. From December to May, the area is rather dry, and the rest of the year is wet. The town is occasionally affected by typhoons during the wet season, which can cause flooding and landslides in some areas.

Pasacao experiences a hot and dry season from February to May. Most visitors and tourists come to Pasacao to relax during these months. Most resorts and beaches are packed with people on Easter Sunday, especially from local communities and other parts of the country.

Demographics

Language

The primary language spoken in Pasacao is Bikol, specifically the Central Bikol dialect. However, many residents also speak Tagalog and English, which are the official languages of the Philippines.

Religion
Despite the presence of a single church, Saint Rose of Lima Parish, and a few chapels, Roman Catholicism is the dominant religion in the municipality. The Church of Jesus Christ of Latter-day Saints, Iglesia ni Kristo, Born Again denominations, Jehovah's Witness chapels, and other Christian denominations are also present across the municipality.

 Economy 
The economy of Pasacao is largely based on agriculture and fishing, with rice, corn, and coconut being the main crops grown in the area. Fishing is also an important industry, with the town's coastal location providing abundant fishing grounds. Many schools and a growing number of local businesses give additional work opportunities for people. Other locals work at the oil depots in Barangay Sta. Rosa Del Sur (the area is also claimed by Barangay Caranan), as well as some labor in Naga and the Metropolitan Manila area. In recent years, there has been a growing interest in eco-tourism, with the municipality's pristine beaches and scenic spots attracting both local and foreign visitors.

 Culture 

 Town Fiesta and Pasa-Pasa Ikaw Festival 
Every year on August, the town celebrates its fiesta as well as the Pasa-Pasa Ikaw Festival. The festival is held in honor of Saint. Rose of Lima, the town's patroness. The municipal government organizes an annual calendar of events that includes pageant competitions, civic and military parades, and other activities.

Overall, the town fiesta and Pasa-Pasa Ikaw Festival are significant events in Pasacao's cultural calendar. These festivals showcase the town's rich cultural heritage and provide a platform for residents to celebrate and express themselves. They also attract visitors from neighboring towns and cities, boosting the town's tourism industry and promoting local businesses.

 Daruanak Summer Festival TBE''

Attractions

Signature Park 
Signature Park (stylized as SigNATURE Park) is an 1,145-square-meter reclaimed property owned by the Pasacao - Local Government Unit. It's located along Acacia Drive, Zone 1B, Barangay Sta. Rose Del Norte-Balogo Junction. The park serves as both a recreational space and a civic center, which makes it a hub for community activities and events.

One of the buildings in the complex is StrEat Park, which is a food park and an outdoor dining area. 

The CBD (Central Business District) Complex is another part of Signature Park, and it houses several important offices and facilities. The Central Business District Terminal, a transportation hub for the area, providing easy access to Naga City. The Tourism office could offer information about local attractions and events, while the PSO and PNP substation provide public safety and police services. The Pasalubong Center is a place where visitors can purchase souvenirs and local products, which can help support the local economy.

The DRRM Complex is another notable feature of Pasacao Signature Park, which includes a covered court and the MDDRMC Office. The MDDRMC Office is responsible for managing disaster risk reduction and management in the area. The park also features an Eco-park Complex, which offers green spaces and features such as an eco-park and plaza. Visitors can relax and unwind in the serene environment of the Eco-park Complex, which also houses the Municipal Police Office Station, serving as a local police station for the area.

Pasacao Boulevard 
Pasacao Boulevard is a waterfront road located in barangay San Cirilo. It is part of the Circumferential Road and Proposed Esplanade that connects San Cirilo to Santa Rosa del Norte and Balogo Road.

Infrastructure

Ports

Port of Pasacao 
Pasacao Seaport, also known as the Port of Pasacao, locally know as Pier, is a fishing, passenger, and cargo port in Camarines Sur. It is situated in Barangay Sta. Rose del Sur. The port serves passengers traveling from Pasacao to Burias in Masbate Province.

The nearby smaller Pasacao Fishport is primarily utilized for fishing and unloading fish, as well as pump boats and fastcrafts for short trips.

Pasacao-Balatan Tourism Coastal Highway 
The Pasacao-Balatan Tourism Coastal Highway is a 40.69-kilometer project of the National Economic and Development Authority (NEDA) and the Build, Build, Build program. It connects the municipalities of Pasacao, San Fernando, Minalabac, Bula, and Balatan, as well as 15 barangays within the aforementioned towns, with the goal of promoting ecotourism in Camarines Sur. There are 13 bridges in the network of roads, as well as intersections, service roads, and other infrastructure.

Education
The town has several schools and educational institutions that offer quality education to its residents.

At the elementary level, there are 16 public elementary schools and 2 private schools that cater to the educational needs of children in Pasacao. The public elementary schools are operated by the Department of Education (DepEd) and offer the government's K-12 program. At the secondary level, there are 6 public high schools and 2 private schools in Pasacao. Students who complete high school can pursue higher education in colleges and universities in nearby cities such as Naga and Legazpi. 

One notable educational institution in Pasacao is the Central Bicol State University of Agriculture (CBSUA) - Pasacao Campus. It was established in 1982 and is one of the satellite campuses of CBSUA in the province. The Pasacao Campus offers undergraduate course in education.

Aside from formal education, Pasacao also promotes non-formal education through the Alternative Learning System (ALS). The ALS is a program offered by the DepEd that provides out-of-school youth and adults an opportunity to complete their elementary or high school education through flexible learning modes such as distance learning, modular learning, and face-to-face classes.

In addition, Pasacao also supports technical and vocational education and training (TVET) through the Camarines Sur Institute of Fisheries and Marine Sciences (CASIFMAS). CASFIMAS offers various vocational courses in fields such as automotive, welding, food and beverage, and electronics, among others. These courses provide residents of Pasacao with the necessary skills to pursue employment opportunities or start their own businesses

Below is the list of the tertiary and secondary level existing schools on the municipality.
 Tertiary
 Camarines Sur Institute of Fisheries and Marine Sciences 
 Camarines Sur Institute of Fisheries and Marine Sciences - Caranan Campus
 Central Bicol State University for Agriculture (CBSUA) - Pasacao Extension Campus

Secondary
 Antipolo Heights Integrated School 
 Arbovitae Plains Montessori Inc. (APMI) - Pasacao Branch 
 Balogo Baptist Christian School, Inc.
 Dalupaon National High School
 Dr. Lorenzo P. Ziga Memorial High School 
 Juan F. Triviño Memorial High School 
 Lyceo de Pasacao 
 Pasacao Academy, Inc.
 Pasacao Municipal High School
 Rolando R. Andaya Memorial High School

Gallery

Notes

References

External links

Official Website of Pasacao, Camarines Sur
 [ Philippine Standard Geographic Code]
Philippine Census Information
Official Site of the Province of Camarines Sur
Barangays of Pasacao, Camarines Sur

Municipalities of Camarines Sur
Metro Naga